Kronau is a hamlet in the Canadian province of Saskatchewan located 28 km (17.5 miles) south east of Regina on Highway 33 in the R.M. of Lajord No. 128, Saskatchewan. Listed as a designated place by Statistics Canada, the hamlet had a population of 209 in the Canada 2006 Census.

History
The area of Kronau was first settled by German-Russians from near the Black Sea and German-Americans from the northern United States during the late 19th and early 20th century.

Heritage sites

St. Peter's Church and Grotto at St. Peter's Colony is 12 km east of Kronau. The Catholic church was completed in 1904 next to a cemetery established in 1892. The grotto built in 1917 by Father Henry Metzger became a pilgrimage site. Father Metzger, a noted artist, also painted the Stations of the Cross in the church. The church and grotto site was listed on the Canadian Register of Historic Places in 2010.
Kronau Bethlehem Heritage Cemetery or Bethlehem Lutheran Church Cemetery was established in 1896. and was listed on the Canadian Register of Historic Places in 1985.

Demographics 

Amenities
Kronau Memorial Hall (built in the late 1940s to honour the soldiers coming home from World War II) 
Kronau Heritage Museum
gas station
curling rink 
outdoor skating rink 
Schnider's Ice Cream Shop

Kronau was once home of the Saar Elementary School, featuring the Eagle mascot.

References

Designated places in Saskatchewan
Lajord No. 128, Saskatchewan
Organized hamlets in Saskatchewan
Division No. 6, Saskatchewan